Platt Adams Preston (November 1, 1837 – March 12, 1900) was an American politician in the state of Washington. He served in the Washington State Senate from 1889 to 1893 (1889–91 for district 8, 1891–93 for district 10).

References

Republican Party Washington (state) state senators
1837 births
1900 deaths
19th-century American politicians